Roman Grant is a fictional character in the HBO series, Big Love, and is portrayed by Harry Dean Stanton. He was the prophet of the Juniper Creek Compound, and is the father of Nicolette Grant and Alby Grant. The character is loosely based on the real life polygamist leader Rulon Jeffs.

History
Little is known of Grant's early life. Born c. 1927. In his younger years Roman Grant, apparently educated in and definitely skilled with finance, was the accountant for Bill Henrickson's maternal grandfather Orville Henrickson, the leader and Prophet of Juniper Creek. One night Orville and Grant went out on a trip and Orville died under very mysterious circumstances while Grant returned unharmed. Grant quickly seized the role of prophet of Juniper Creek shortly afterward. The older residents of Juniper Creek have implied Grant was responsible for his predecessor's death.

Grant has always been involved in Bill's life. Roman found Bill too much like his grandfather and a potential threat to his power so he instructed Bill's father Frank Harlow to kick Bill off the compound when Bill was only 14 years old. Nevertheless, he assisted Bill much later financially with the expenses of his first wife Barb's cancer treatment and with the opening of his first Home Plus store, the former in exchange for Bill's marrying Roman's daughter Nicki and the latter in exchange for a share of its profits (though whether this was for the first store only is a source of serious contention between the men as the store expands into a chain).

Roman loves music and has been heard singing both hymns (including The Church in the Wildwood) and folk-songs (including Big Rock Candy Mountain [in spite of its references to cigarette trees and alcohol]) for his own entertainment and that of his hosts and guests.  His most prized possession is a guitar that accompanied the first Mormon pioneers to the Salt Lake Valley in 1847.

Roman was involved in the death of Kathy Marquardt, and as a result was killed by her fiancee Joey Henrickson in the final episode of season three. Joey waited for Roman in a closet in Roman's home and as Roman played the guitar, Joey emerged and then suffocated him with a pillow. This may well have major implications as Roman was to be indicted for Kathy's murder the following day thanks to new testimony from Selma Greene, unbeknownst to Joey who was taking revenge into his own hands.

Family
Grant, a polygamist, has 14 wives and is betrothed to 15-year-old Rhonda Volmer, a union he claims was directed by a divine revelation. His sixth wife is Adaleen Grant, who is his administrative assistant and who has the prestige and responsibilities usually afforded a first wife. Roman has 31 children (18 sons and 13 daughters) ranging in age from a 59-year-old son named Homer (never seen on the series, but his name appeared on a list in one episode) to an infant named Emory.  Unlike the children of most polygamists in the series, all of Roman's seem to go by the surname Grant, for he is openly polygamous.  Most important to the series are Adaleen's children: daughter Nicolette, the plural wife of Bill Henrickson; and son Alby Grant, who is his father's heir-apparent.  At least 4 of Grant's children are out of favor: Nicki makes references to 2 brothers (Rick & Jesse) who are "in exile"; and, during a second-season episode when Nicki attempts to visit her mother while her father is hospitalized, the guards at the Compound entrance display a list of Grant's children, most of them in the "Good", but Nicki and 3 others (Lester, Kenneth & Almon) in the "Bad" category.  Nicki also mentions a brother (David) who lives out of state. In one episode Grant stated he has 187 grandchildren.

Grant is not the least bit ashamed of being polygamous and appears on television defending his lifestyle and his sect. He outed the Henrickson family as polygamists at the end of the first season so that they could "live in the light". He shares a rambling stately old home known as "The Big House", previously the home of Orville Henrickson, with several of his wives. (In an episode about Nicki's credit-card bills, it was revealed that "The Big House" was recently enlarged to include an additional wing for Rhonda funded completely by his wife Adaleen's credit card.)

Grant appears to be a caring father in spite of the immensity of his family, however some scenes allude to possible abuse. While attending his daughter Nicki’s son's birthday party, Bill catches him and Nicki in a questionable position on their bed. Grant shows empathy when he is seen extremely concerned over the attempted murder of his son Alby. In another episode, Bill witnessed him holding his infant son.

Though he is almost 80 years old and this may account for some of his diminished interest in sex,  Grant does not appear to be particularly lecherous.  Even his relationship with his betrothed, Rhonda, more than 60 years his junior, seems to be respectful and their relationship has never been consummated nor does he seem to be solely interested in her for sexual pleasure.  Other than polygamy, he has never been implied to be guilty of sexual improprieties (i.e. adultery, child molestation, incest, etc.) such as those practiced by the fictional Greene and Abbot clans or the real-life LeBaron and Kingston polygamous cults upon whom the Greenes and Abbots are probably based, at least in part.

Grant is president of the United Effort Brotherhood, the business and investment arm of his sect that, mostly under his leadership, is worth many millions of dollars, much of it liquid. Though gambling, alcohol, and other vices prohibited by fundamentalist Mormonism are absolutely forbidden from the compound, Grant, and the other chairmen of the Brotherhood do not have qualms about investing in such ventures, seeing it as a way of enriching the Brotherhood at the expense of sinners. Grant is a man very much concerned with monetary profit but seems more concerned with the power and security of money than by any luxuries, for nothing about his lifestyle seems at all extravagant.

Alby
Following Grant's shooting Alby claimed to have been told by God that he should stand in for the ailing Prophet.  Alby then took total control of his father's well-being, and allowed no one, other than himself and his wife, to see Roman.  Alby and his wife kept Roman in a coma using morphine and other painkillers.

When Adaleen Grant sneaks into her husband's room and witnesses Alby drugging Roman, she sneaks out of the compound with Grant and takes him to her daughter Nicolette's house where he remains until Bill sends him back to the compound.

Business
When Bill severed all ties between the compound and Henrickson's Home Plus, Grant has done all in his power to convince Bill of his mistake.  In addition to being (at least seemingly) greedy, Grant is an extremely well informed business leader who has converted his following into a well invested diverse powerhouse and he is not willing to let go easily of a lucrative and growing business.  Grant is also extremely adept at finding legal loopholes (such as zoning and historic preservation) to legally harass Henrickson.

Relationship with other polygamist sects
Grant's many enemies include Hollis Greene, the leader and prophet of a rival polygamous cult.  Their enmity seems to go back for many decades but most recently has centered upon Juniper Creek's business interests and has resulted in violence from and against both sides.  After stepping out of his favorite diner near the Juniper Creek compound, two women associated with Greene walked up unexpectedly, announced his name, and shot Grant three times, then ran off.

However, by season three, it is revealed that Hollis Greene's cross-dressing wife Selma is Roman's sister.  Hollis Greene and Roman have seemingly become allies, as Roman convinces the Greenes to take Kathy Marquardt as another wife to prevent her from causing trouble at Juniper Creek. When this goes badly they go back to being rivals. Roman later tries to help Bill get his niece back from the Greenes after they kidnap her in an elaborate plan by Bill to have both the Greenes and Roman arrested.

Arrest
Upon returning to the Compound with Joey Henrickson and Adaleen Grant, he was arrested for 7 counts of violation of the Mann Act for transporting women across state lines for "immoral purposes".

Death
Seeking revenge for his would be second wife Kathy Marquart's death Joey Hendrickson smothered Roman with a pillow. Roman's body was discovered by Adaleen who hid it in a meat freezer and tried to make it appear as though Roman was still alive and had gone into hiding in Mexico.
The FBI searched the compound and interrogated Nicki to learn Roman's whereabouts, claiming he was back in Utah and placing funds in an account under Nicki's name. Nicki discovers her father's body in the freezer while searching for bacon. Her mother claims that he had died while playing a song and that she had moved him to the freezer after she found him. She claimed that she didn't want people to know that he was dead because he had once claimed that he would live until the age of 126.

References and notes

Big Love characters
Fictional businesspeople
Fictional cult leaders
Fictional prophets
Television characters introduced in 2006